The Swedish West India Company was a Swedish chartered company which was based in the West Indies. It was the main operator in the Swedish slave trade during its existence.

Between 1786 and 1805, the company operated from the Swedish island of Saint-Barthélemy. The company was a private enterprise with royal monopoly on all Swedish trade via Saint Barthélemy. Three quarters of profits went to the company, one quarter to the Swedish state.

Other Swedish chartered companies 
The company should not be confused with the 17th-century Swedish South Company, also called New Sweden Company, best known for establishing New Sweden in the Delaware region (or much of today's Delaware Valley), which operated between 1638 and 1655.

See also

 List of trading companies
 Swedish colony of Saint Barthélemy

External links
 Mémoire St Barth | History of St Barthélemy (archives & history of slavery, slave trade and their abolition), Comité de Liaison et d'Application des Sources Historiques.

African slave trade
History of Saint Barthélemy
Trading companies
Chartered companies
West India
Companies established in 1786
1786 establishments in Sweden
Companies disestablished in 1805
1805 disestablishments in Sweden
Political history of Sweden